Kaokochloa is a genus of African plants in the grass family.

Species
The only known species is Kaokochloa nigrirostris, native to Namibia.

References

Chloridoideae
Endemic flora of Namibia
Monotypic Poaceae genera